No. 629 Squadron RAuxAF was a non-flying squadron of the Royal Auxiliary Air Force formed in 1999 for "Helicopter Support".

For the period April to September 1939, "No. 629 (Chiltern) Squadron" of the Auxiliary Air Force was allocated the Squadron Code LQ for use by the squadron, were it to be formed, but this did not happen.

References

Notes

Bibliography

 Halley, James J. The Squadrons of the Royal Air Force & Commonwealth, 1918-1988. Tonbridge, Kent, UK: Air Britain (Historians) Ltd., 1988. .
 Jefford, C.G. RAF Squadrons, a Comprehensive Record of the Movement and Equipment of all RAF Squadrons and their Antecedents since 1912. Shrewsbury, Shropshire, UK: Airlife Publishing, 2001. .

External links
 Squadron histories and more for nos. 621-650 squadron on rafweb

629 Squadron